Acropolitis is a genus of moths belonging to the subfamily Tortricinae of the family Tortricidae.

Species
Acropolitis canana (Walker, 1863)
Acropolitis canigerana (Walker, 1863)
Acropolitis ergophora (Meyrick, 1910)
Acropolitis excelsa (Meyrick, 1910)
Acropolitis hedista (Turner, 1916)
Acropolitis magnana (Walker, 1863)
Acropolitis malacodes (Meyrick, 1910)
Acropolitis ptychosema (Turner, 1927)
Acropolitis rudisana (Walker, 1863)

See also
List of Tortricidae genera

References

 , 2005: World catalogue of insects volume 5 Tortricidae.
 , 1881, Proc. Linn. Soc. N.S. W. 6: 418.

External links

tortricidae.com

Archipini
Tortricidae genera
Taxa named by Edward Meyrick